The Canton of Angers-Centre is a former French canton located in the Maine-et-Loire département of France, in the arrondissement of Angers. It had 35,190 inhabitants (2012). It was disbanded following the French canton reorganisation which came into effect in March 2015. It comprised part of the commune of Angers.

See also 
 Arrondissement of Angers
 Cantons of the Maine-et-Loire department
 Communes of the Maine-et-Loire department

References

External links
 canton of Angers-Centre on the web of the General Council of Maine-et-Loire

Angers-Centre
Angers
2015 disestablishments in France
States and territories disestablished in 2015